Fakhruddin Ahmed was a Member of the 3rd National Assembly of Pakistan as a representative of East Pakistan.

Career
Ahmed was a Member of the 3rd National Assembly of Pakistan representing Mymemsingh-VII. He was a Member of the  4th National Assembly of Pakistan representing Mymensingh-V.

References

Pakistani MNAs 1962–1965
Living people
Year of birth missing (living people)
Pakistani MNAs 1965–1969